The following is a list of Quincentennial historical markers unveiled by the National Historical Commission and the National Quincentennial Committee as part of the 2021 Quincentennial Commemorations in the Philippines (QCP).

Background

Sites
Thirty four historical markers will be unveiled in several sites in the Philippines as part of the 2021 Quincentennial Commemorations in the country. The markers were installed on site with the help of the Department of the Interior and Local Government (DILG) and the Armed Forces of the Philippines. Of these markers, ten were installed in Eastern Visayas. The first marker unveiled was the Suluan marker in the island of the same name in Guiuan, Eastern Samar on March 16, 2021, with the last marker scheduled to be unveiled on October 28, 2021.

Design
The markers were created through the coordination of the  National Historical Commission of the Philippines (NHCP) and the National Quincentennial Committee (NQC), the latter being the main government-run organizing body for the 2021 Quincentennial. The markers collectively depict select events of the Magellan-Elcano voyage in the Philippine archipelago. Each marker consist of a pedestal with a globe motif on top as a finial. The tiltation of the globe element was also certified by the Philippine Space Agency. On one side of the pedestal is the commemoration plaque and on another side is a dust marble relief which has a design dependent on the specific site of the marker. The reliefs are made by sculptors Jonas Roces and Francis Apiles and are based on sketches by muralist Derrick Macutay. The NHCP described the designs as a deviation from typical "orientalist" depictions by foreigners of pre-colonial Filipinos as savages. The markers are an attempt to depict events of the expedition from a Filipino point of view.

List

References

See also
Historical markers of the Philippines

Quincentennial
Quincentennial historical markers in the Philippines, List of